Ezhai Jaathi is a 1993 Indian Tamil-language political action drama film directed by Liaquat Ali Khan, starring Vijayakanth and Jaya Prada. It was released on 19 February 1993.

Plot 
Subhash is the son industrialist Udayar, an influential man who helps pull down one government, and set up another. Subhash is sympathetic to the cause of down-trodden lives in their midst, fighting for their rights. Initially, his father's name is Armour but when his actions—like his clashes with the son of a minister —threaten to bring down the very government which his father supports, latter washes his hands of him, and he is a market man.

The local MLA exploits the innocent people of the slums and gets their votes by using the common caste-factor. Subhash acquaints them of their rights, exposes the politicians for what they are and earns the love and respect of the poor. Thilakavathi, an MP is sympathetic to his cause for which she is held prisoner by her colleagues. However, all ends well with Subhash recovering from a near-fatal wound and the exposed politicians getting their just deserts throughout an irate job.

Cast 

Vijayakanth as Subhash Chandra Bose
Jaya Prada as Thilakavathi
Vijayakumar as Odeyar
M. N. Nambiar as Iyer
Manorama as Nagamma
Mansoor Ali Khan as Rajarathinam's son
Livingston as Thilakavathi's step father
John Amirtharaj as Rajarathinam
Senthil as Petha Perumal
Thyagu as MLA
LIC Narasimhan as Selection officer
Krishnamoorthy as Inspector
Yuvasri as Shankar's Sister
Murali Kumar as Blind man
Kokila as Murali kumar's wife
S. N. Vasanth as Shankar
Vijay Krishnaraj as Opposition leader
Dharani as Shanthi
Prabhu Deva (Special appearance)
Thalapathy Dinesh (Uncredited)
Vadivelu as Villager (Guest Appearance)

Soundtrack 
The soundtrack was composed by Ilaiyaraaja, with lyrics by Vaali and Gangai Amaran.

Reception 
Malini Mannath of The Indian Express wrote, "The dialogue are punchy, and the film, though a little prosaic, is able to hold one's attention". R. P. R. of Kalki wrote that despite grinding the same dough, there was no unnecessary romance, no absurd comedy track; the only thing is length could have been trimmed.

References

External links 

1990s political drama films
1990s Tamil-language films
1993 action drama films
1993 films
Films scored by Ilaiyaraaja
Indian action drama films
Indian political drama films
Political action films